WTLX (100.5 FM "100.5 FM ESPN") is a commercial radio station, licensed to Monona, Wisconsin and serving the Madison metropolitan area.  The station is owned by Good Karma Broadcasting, LLC, and runs a sports radio format as a network affiliate of ESPN Radio, sharing most programming with Milwaukee based WKTI-FM identifying jointly on air as ESPN Wisconsin.  Studios and offices were on North Pinckney Street in Madison for 5.5 years from mid-2016 to the end of 2021.  Jason Wilde stated on December 21, 2021 during an episode of Wilde & Tausch that the show that day was the last show from that studio as the radio station was going to be moving to a new location.  The transmitter is off Tower Road, using an antenna on the water tower at the Mendota Mental Health Institute in Madison.

Programming
WTLX's schedule includes programming from ESPN Radio as well as Wisconsin-based shows also airing on Milwaukee-area sister station WKTI 94.5 FM. Local programming includes Scalzo & Brust with Greg Scalzo and Ben Brust, Rutledge and Hamilton with Jim Rutledge and Olympic Gold medalist Matt Hamilton, and Wilde & Tausch, hosted by three-time Wisconsin sportswriter of the year Jason Wilde and former Wisconsin Badger and Green Bay Packer Mark Tauscher.  Weekday ESPN Radio programming on the station includes Keyshawn, JWill, & Max with Keyshawn Johnson, Jay Williams, and Max Kellerman, and Greeny with Mike Greenberg.  Local weekday and speciality programming includes Thursday Night Drive, The Pat Richter Show, Wisconsin College GameDay, and Prep Mania.

Live sports programming on WTLX features Milwaukee Bucks basketball and some select local high school sports play-by-play. The station also carries national sports play-by-play from ESPN Radio, including NBA basketball, Major League Baseball, and college football.

History
The station first signed on in 1989 as WWAM.  In 1990 it changed call letters to WYKY, airing an adult contemporary music format as "Key 100.5."  Then in 1998, it changed to WTLX, airing a "hot talk" format as "100X."  The 100X schedule included the Howard Stern and Don & Mike shows, along with sports programming from Sporting News Radio and later Fox Sports Radio.  By the mid-2000s, the station would morph into an all-sports format, with both national and Wisconsin-based programming.  On January 1, 2009, WTLX became a network affiliate of ESPN Radio, whose programming had been airing in Madison on rival station 1070 WTSO.  Along with that affiliation change, WTLX's city of license moved from Columbus, Wisconsin, 27 miles northeast of Madison, to the Madison suburb of Monona.  According to Jason Wilde on an episode of Wilde & Tausch from December 21, 2021, the radio studio when he joined ESPN Madison was located on Regent Street under the Regent Apartments at 1402 Regent Street in Madison a block east of Camp Randall Stadium.  The same episode of Wilde & Tausch also mentions that previous to Pinckney Street the radio studio had been located at the WISC-TV studios at 7025 Raymond Road on the southwest side of Madison. Since January of 2022, the station has operated out of the American Family Insurance SPARK Building located on E. Washington Ave in downtown Madison.

References

External links
WTLX official website

ESPN Radio stations
TLX
Radio stations established in 2001